Geshe Rabten (1921–1986) was a Tibetan Geshe born in Tibet in 1921.

He was a student at Sera Monastery in Lhasa, and achieved Geshe status before leaving Tibet in 1959. He became known as a debater, scholar, and meditation master.

Lama Yeshe and Lama Zopa Rinpoche were guided by him in their early days outside of Tibet.

In the mid 1960s Geshe Rabten was a religious assistant to the Dalai Lama.

The Dalai Lama asked him to teach Dharma to Westerners in Dharamshala in 1969.

He went to teach in Switzerland in 1974.

He was the founder of the Rabten Choeling Centre (which was originally named Tharpa Choeling) in Switzerland in 1979. He remained there till his death in 1986.

Other centres that he founded in Europe included the Tibetan centre in Hamburg, Tashi Rabten at the Letzehof, Puntsog Rabten in Munich and Gephel Ling in Milan.

Works

References

1986 deaths
Geshes
1921 births
Gelug Lamas